Meat Wave is an American punk band from Chicago, Illinois, United States. Their music is described as post-something, melancholic and aggressive. They have released four albums.

History
Meat Wave was formed in 2011 after Truman & His Trophy disbanded. The trio set out to play with a more aggressive tone than they were used to in their previous ensembles. They toured with Pup  in 2016 and with Cursive in 2018.

Band members
 Chris Sutter – lead vocals, guitars
 Joe Gac – bass guitar
 Ryan Wizniak – drums

Discography

Albums
Meat Wave (2012)
Delusion Moon (2015)
The Incessant (2017)
Malign Hex (2022)

EP
 Brother (2015)
Volcano Park (2021)

References

External links
 Official Website

Punk rock groups from Illinois
Big Scary Monsters Recording Company artists